Wonder Dog is a side-scrolling platform game developed by Core Design and released by JVC Musical Industries for the Sega CD in 1992. It is one of the first games developed for the system. The player controls a dog who must rescue their home planet from invading forces.

In 1993, Core Design released a port of the game for the Amiga. Magazine reviews ranged from from 84% in The One Amiga to 31% in CU Amiga.

Plot 
The peaceful dog-ruled planet K-9 finds itself under attack by the evil Pit Bully empire. In a last-ditch effort to save his world, Dr. Kibble fast tracks the Wonder Dog project, an experiment to create a superpowered dog. Running out of time, he tests the serum on his newborn son and sends him to Earth with a special outfit called the Wonder Suit. His son crash lands on the planet and immediately befriends a boy. However, the two are separated as the boy's father will not let him keep the dog. The dog then returns to the ship, dons the Wonder Suit and becomes Wonder Dog, who must save the planet K-9 from the Pit Bully invasion.

References 

1992 video games
Alien invasions in video games
Amiga games
Amiga 1200 games
Cancelled PC games
Core Design games
Fictional dogs
Platform games
Sega CD games
Superhero video games
Video games about dogs
Video games about extraterrestrial life
Video games developed in the United Kingdom
Video games set on fictional planets